Invizimals is an augmented reality video game franchise developed by Novarama and published by Sony Computer Entertainment Europe. The series, which originally began in 2009 as a video game on PSP, has since inspired toys, trading cards, comics and an animated television series telling an interconnected transmedia story.

Games

Invizimals

Invizimals is a PlayStation Portable augmented reality video game developed by Novarama, and published by Sony Computer Entertainment Europe. It is a collectible creature game, and was bundled with the PSP's camera attachment on launch.

Invizimals: Shadow Zone

Invizimals: Shadow Zone is a PlayStation Portable augmented reality video game developed by Novarama, and published by Sony Computer Entertainment Europe. It is the sequel to 2009's Invizimals. As such, it is a collectible creature game, and requires the PSP's camera attachment for play. It was released on November 12, 2010 in Europe and on October 25, 2011 in North America. The game also includes a needed trap card to play but can be easily replaced by printing a new one.

Invizimals: The Lost Tribes

Invizimals: The Lost Tribes is a PlayStation Portable augmented reality video game developed by Novarama and published by Sony Computer Entertainment Europe. It is the sequel to 2009's Invizimals, and 2010's Invizimals: Shadow Zone. As such, it is a collectible creature game, and requires the PSP's camera attachment for play. It was released on November 2011 in Europe and September 2014 in North America.

Invizimals: The Alliance

Invizimals: The Alliance is an augmented reality video game for the PlayStation Vita. It features cross-play multiplayer interactivity with the PlayStation 3 title Invizimals: The Lost Kingdom. It was released on 30 October 2013 in Europe simultaneously with Invizimals: The Lost Kingdom.

Invizimals: The Lost Kingdom

Invizimals: The Lost Kingdom is a video game for the PlayStation 3, and was released on 30 October 2013 in Europe simultaneously with Invizimals: The Alliance.
Invizimals: Hidden Challenges
Invizimals: TV Tracker
Invizimals: New Alliance
Invizimals: Revolution
Invizimals: The Resistance
Invizimals: Battle of the Hunters

Animated Series

In September 2012, Sony Computer Entertainment Europe announced that a 26 episode Invizimals computer animated series would be produced by BRB International. The show was created by BRB's Screen21 division and Novarama, who are both based in Barcelona, with writers from North America and animation done in China. It billed itself as the first augmented-reality cartoon TV series, with on-screen scannable markers that would unlock content in Invizimals: The Alliance on PlayStation Vita and the Invizimals: TV Tracker app for iOS and Android devices.

The series launched in Spain on December 6, 2013 with a television movie on Super3 and Clan called Invizimals: The Alliance. A second TV movie, entitled Invizimals: A Tale of Two Dimensions, aired on both channels on December 27 and 31, respectively. The two films were also released on DVD, iTunes and the PlayStation Store. They would later be broken up into 6 twenty-two minute episodes for reruns. The first regular episodes of the series began airing on Super3 on November 29 and December 5, 2014 on Clan. To promote the debut, local pop singer Abraham Mateo produced a song and music video called "Cazado" (Hunted). The final 13 episodes began airing November 2015.

The series had its English television debut in Australia, when the two TV movies premiered during Eleven's Toasted TV block on December 15 and December 22, 2013. Episodes that weren't recuts of the TV movies began on June 7, 2015, with the final batch of 13 starting broadcast on October 15, 2016. The first 13 episodes became available to stream on Netflix in the United States, Canada, the United Kingdom and various other countries on July 1, 2015, under the name Invizimals: The Alliance Files. Invizimals began airing on Primo TV in the US on January 17, 2017.

In addition to English, Catalan and Spanish, the series has been dubbed into Arabic, Brazilian Portuguese, Croatian, Czech, Dutch, French, German, Greek, Hungarian, Italian, Japanese, Polish, Portuguese, Romanian and Russian for broadcast on Al Jazeera, Megamax, Multimania, Gulli, K2, Star Channel, SIC and other channels around the world.

Merchandising

The franchise has spawned a number of products launched in Europe. In 2010, Spanish toy company Comansi secured the license to produce a series of collectible figurines based on the franchise. That same year, Panini signed on for sticker albums and trading cards in Spain and Portugal, Edibas Collection agreed to produce trading cards and figures in Italy, while Safta produced school supplies for the Iberian market. In 2011, Panini launched a line of sticker albums and cards that featured augmented reality connectivity with Invizimals and Invizimals: Shadow Zone. With sales surpassing 6 million units, the company then licensed the brand for all territories in Europe. Between 2011 and 2016, Panini published a 37 issue Invizimals magazine that featured tips, comics and previews for upcoming games. In 2013, IMC Toys acquired the global master license to produce toys based on the series.

Some of the merchandise has launched with direct video game tie-ins by Novarama and Sony Computer Entertainment Europe. Panini's Invizimals: Hidden Challenges trading card range launched in early 2013 alongside an app for PlayStation Portable, PlayStation Vita, iOS and Android that allowed players to experience augmented reality battles using the cards. Within two weeks, it had surpassed 100,000 downloads in Spain and Portugal. As of September 2013, 10 million Hidden Challenges cards were sold with downloads topping 500,000. This was followed up with a separate app for the New Alliance line in 2014. IMC's toyline features the ability to scan the figurines into the Invizimals: Revolution app. This functionality was also included in a patch for Invizimals: The Alliance.

As of October 2014, Panini has sold 44 million sticker packs and 31 million Invizimals trading cards in Europe.

See also
The Eye of Judgment, a PlayStation 3 video trading card game which uses the PlayStation Eye for similar augmented reality effects
Pokémon GO, an augmented reality monster catching game for mobile devices

References

External links
Official Invizimals Site
Novarama's Invizimals page

Video game franchises
Video game franchises introduced in 2009
Sony Interactive Entertainment franchises
Video games developed in Spain
Augmented reality
Augmented reality applications
Invizimals